Orthogenium femorale is a species of beetle in the family Carabidae, the only species in the genus Orthogenium.

The status of this genus and species is considered doubtful or invalid.

References

Harpalinae